Two Complete Science-Adventure Books was an American pulp science fiction magazine, published by Fiction House, which lasted for eleven issues between 1950 and 1954 as a companion to Planet Stories.  Each issue carried two novels or long novellas.  It was initially intended to carry only reprints, but soon began to publish original stories. Contributors included Isaac Asimov, Robert A. Heinlein, Arthur C. Clarke, Poul Anderson, John Brunner, and James Blish.  The magazine folded in 1954, almost at the end of the pulp era.

Publication history 
The early 1950s saw dramatic changes in the history of U.S. science fiction publishing. At the start of 1949, all but one of the major magazines in the field were in pulp format; by the end of 1955, almost all had either ceased publication or switched to digest format. Despite the rapid decline of the pulp market, several new science fiction magazines were launched in pulp format during these years.  Planet Stories, a pulp sf magazine that focused on interplanetary adventure, was sufficiently successful to switch from quarterly to bimonthly in late 1950.  The publisher, Fiction House, also decided to launch a companion magazine, aimed more specifically at the growing readership for pocket books.  This was Two Complete Science-Adventure Books; the first issue was dated Winter 1950, and it appeared three times a year on a regular schedule.  Malcolm Reiss, who oversaw several of Fiction House's magazines and comics, was editorially involved with the Two Complete Science-Adventure Stories throughout its life, but for the first three issues Jerome Bixby, who at that time was editing Planet Stories, took on the new magazine as well.  Bixby left in 1951 to work for Standard Publications. After this, Reiss was left in sole control until 1953, when Katherine Daffron was appointed editor. Daffron edited the magazine for the last two issues.  Fiction House tried another companion magazine that year, Tops in Science Fiction, but it lasted for only two issues.  Two Complete Science-Adventures Books outlasted Tops in Science Fiction by only a few months; it was cancelled in 1954, amid the collapse of the overall pulp market.  The final issue was dated Spring 1954, and Planet Stories itself only lasted until the following year.

Two Complete Science-Adventure Books typically carried about 80,000 words, which was noticeably more than most of its competitors, which usually ran from 45,000 to 75,000 words.  Fiction House paid $300 or more for the original novels it printed.

Contents 
The magazine was originally intended to be a vehicle for reprinting novels.  The title and format were an echo of Two Complete Detective Books Magazine, which had been published, also by Fiction House, in the 1930s.  The first issue included Isaac Asimov's Pebble in the Sky, and L. Ron Hubbard's "The Kingslayer".  Both of these were reprints: Pebble in the Sky had been published by Doubleday earlier in the year, and "The Kingslayer" had appeared in Hubbard's short story collection The Kingslayer, published by Fantasy Publishing Company, Inc., in 1949.  Subsequent issues abandoned the policy of reprinting two novels, and for a while each issue featured one original story and one reprint.  In some later issues both stories were original.

Although the authors included names such as James Blish and Poul Anderson, much of the material was, in the words of sf historian Joseph Marchesani, "derivative space opera", particular the original novels.  The original stories that appeared in the magazine included  "The Wanton of Argus", an early story by John Brunner; "Seeker of the Sphinx", by Arthur C. Clarke; "Sword of Xota" and "Sargasso of Lost Cities", both by James Blish; and "The Tritonian Ring", by L. Sprague de Camp.  Reprints included The Time Machine by H.G. Wells; Beyond This Horizon, by Robert A. Heinlein (under the pseudonym Anson MacDonald); and The Humanoids by Jack Williamson.

Bixby included a column for readers' letters in the issues he edited, but Reiss and Daffron did not, and none of the three wrote editorials.

The following table shows which novels appeared in which issues.

Bibliographic details

Two Complete Science-Adventure Books was edited primarily by Jerome Bixby for the first three issues, then by Malcolm Reiss for six issues, and then primarily by Katherine Daffron for the last two issues. Reiss was involved with editing the magazine throughout its run.

The schedule was completely regular, with issues dated Spring, Summer, and Winter of each year.  The magazine was in pulp format throughout; each issue was priced at 25 cents.  The first three issues were 144 pages; this was reduced to 128 pages for the Winter 1951 issue, reduced again to 112 pages for the Spring 1952 issue, and reduced further to 96 pages for the next four issues.  The last two issues were 128 pages long.  The publisher was listed as Wings Publishing Co., in New York for the first six issues and in Stamford, Connecticut, for the last five issues.

Notes

References

Sources

External links 
 

Defunct science fiction magazines published in the United States
Fantasy fiction magazines
Pulp magazines
Magazines established in 1950
Magazines disestablished in 1954
Science fiction magazines established in the 1950s
Magazines published in Connecticut
Magazines published in New York (state)